Bangor Area High School is a four-year public high school located in Bangor, Pennsylvania in Northampton County, Pennsylvania in the Lehigh Valley region of eastern Pennsylvania. It is the only high school in the Bangor Area School District. 

As of the 2021–22 school year, Bangor Area High School had a student enrollment of 908 students and 59.77 classroom teachers on an FTE basis for a student–teacher ratio of 15.19, according to National Center for Education Statistics data.

Bangor Area High School's colors are maroon and white and its mascot is the Slater, and its athletic teams compete in the Colonial League.

Extracurriculars

Athletics

Its main athletic rival is Pen Argyl Area High School. The school's athletic teams belong to the PIAA's District XI, and is a member of the Colonial League.

Boys' Sports 

Baseball –  AAAAA
Basketball –  AAAAA
Cross country – AAA
Football – AAAA
Golf – AAA
Soccer – AAA
Swimming – AA
Tennis – AAA
Track and field – AAA
Wrestling – AAA

Girls' Sports 
Basketball – AAAAA
Cheerleading – AAAAAA
Cross country – AA
Field hockey – AA
Soccer – AAA
Softball – AAAA
Swimming – AA
Tennis – AA
Track and field – AAA

Marching band
The Welsh heritage of Bangor is represented by its band, whose uniforms are modeled after those of the Welsh Guard. The Slater Band has played in the Gator bowl in Gainesville, Florida and won an honorary mention. They have also participated in Disney World's Spectromagic Parade, and went on their "Tribute to Heroes Tour" in Ireland, Wales, and England during Easter Week of 2007. The band's trademark songs include "Men of Harlech" and "Rule, Britannia!"

Notable alumni
Sound the Alarm, pop rock band

References

External links
Official website
Bangor Area High School athletics official website
Bangor Area High School on Facebook
Bangor Area High School on Twitter
Bangor Area High School athletics on Twitter
Bangor Area High School profile at Niche
Bangor Area High School sports coverage at The Express-Times

Public high schools in Pennsylvania
Schools in Northampton County, Pennsylvania